K-hole is the feeling of getting a high enough dose of ketamine to experience a state of dissociation. This intense detachment from reality is often a consequence of accidental overconsumption of ketamine; however, some users consciously seek out the k-hole as they find the powerful dissociative effects to be quite pleasurable and enlightening. Regardless of the subjective experiences of k-holing, there are many psychological and physical risks associated with such high levels of ketamine consumption.

Recreational usage 
Ketamine is an NMDA receptor antagonist, developed in the 1960s to induce anesthesia in patients but recreational users have found great appeal in its antidepressant, dissociative and hallucinatory effects that are characteristic of the k-hole experience. Whereas the common recreational dose of ketamine is roughly 30–75 mg, a dose of more than 150 mg is required to enter the k-hole. The k-hole, or “k-holing”, can produce intense psychological effects, such as hallucinations, and physical effects, such as uncoordinated movement or dizziness. Often likened to a “near-death” experience, entering the k-hole can inhibit movement and speech, and even produce paranoia and violent agitation.

Experiences 
The experience of k-hole varies greatly for each individual. The intensity and length are influenced by the users' current mental state, previous experience and drug dosage. Ketamine induces dose-related effects that include distortion of time and space, hallucinations and mild dissociative effects. During k-hole, users experience an enhanced detachment from the environment, resulting in an inability to respond to surroundings and move their bodies functionally. During these states, perception seems to lie deep within consciousness so that reality on the 'outside' world appears to reside in the distance. A high number of recreational users report that the most appealing effects of this experience are ‘melting into surroundings’, ‘visual hallucinations’, ‘out of body experience’ and ‘giggliness’. By contrast, the least frequent and most negative effects include near-death experiences, astral travel and alien phenomena. Physical health problems, like the so-called 'K-cramps' and gastric pain, and unappealing mental side-effects, like 'memory loss' and 'decreased sociability' are also reported post-k-hole.

Despite its addictive risks, ketamine is considered by many to be 'harmless' and thus a 'drug of choice'. Recreational users seem to be in discord about the k-hole. Many individuals describe it as a fascinating life-changing experience and a spiritual journey resulting in some form of enlightenment. They state that this experience provided clairvoyance and assisted them to get through mental disorders like depression and social anxiety. About half of the recreational users describe the k-hole as a positive experience, as it provides 'a short escape from their daily problems'. Other users emphasize the danger of having a near-death experience. Even though some people seem to enjoy and actively look for the k-hole, for many it is still an unwanted side effect of an overdose of ketamine. They describe the k-hole as a "bad LSD trip".

Risks 
While many ketamine-users may find the dissociative effects of falling into a k-hole to be pleasurable, coming out of this state of dissociation turns out to be rather difficult. As a result, individuals find themselves in an on-going state of disconnection from the world and from life. Short-term risks of "k-holing" include the feeling of nausea and/or vomiting, increased heart rate and elevated blood pressure, as well as the loss of coordination. Frequent k-hole experiences can also result in episodic and semantic memory impairments. Depending on how long this state lasts, hallucinations and symptoms of psychosis can develop. The k-hole experience can produce physical risks. For instance, bladder damage can be an indication of ketamine-induced (ulcerative) interstitial cystitis. Cardiac issues and seizures belong to the long-term effects as well.

Implications in society 
The k-hole's potential to severely impair an individuals ability to move or communicate has widespread implications in society. Ketamine is considered in the class of date rape drugs because it is odorless, tasteless, and can easily be slipped into food/drinks - or even rolled into cigarettes - without the awareness of the consumer. For this reason, k-hole is often used to facilitate sexual assault. The loss of consciousness and impaired memory that results from the k-hole makes ketamine a date-rape drug of choice as many victims do not remember the assault the next day. The consequences of this include increasingly unreliable statistics about sexual assault rates despite increasing instances of rape. This also contributes to the large percentage of unreported instances of sexual violence and unconnected rapists.

References 

Slang
Drug culture
Psychological concepts